The actions of vasopressin are mediated by stimulation of tissue-specific G protein-coupled receptors (GPCRs) called vasopressin receptors that are classified into the V1 (V1A), V2, and V3 (V1B) receptor subtypes. These three subtypes differ in localization, function and signal transduction mechanisms.

Subtypes
There are three subtypes of vasopressin receptor: V1A (V1), V1B (V3) and V2.

V1 receptor 

V1 receptors (V1Rs) are found in high density on vascular smooth muscle and cause vasoconstriction by an increase in intracellular calcium via the phosphatidyl–inositol-bisphosphate cascade. Cardiac myocytes also possess V1R. Additionally V1R are located in brain, testis, superior cervical ganglion, liver, blood vessels, and renal medulla.

V1R is present on platelets, which upon stimulation induces an increase in intracellular calcium, facilitating thrombosis. Studies have indicated that due to polymorphism of platelet V1R there is significant heterogeneity in the aggregation response of normal human platelets to vasopressin.

V1Rs are found in kidney, where they occur in high density on medullary interstitial cells, vasa recta, and epithelial cells of the collecting duct. Vasopressin acts on medullary vasculature through V1R to reduce blood flow to inner medulla without affecting blood flow to outer medulla. V1Rs on the luminal membrane of the collecting duct limit the antidiuretic action of vasopressin. Additionally, vasopressin selectively contracts efferent arterioles probably through the V1R, but not the afferent arteriole.

V2 receptor 

V2 receptor (V2R) differs from V1R primarily in the number of sites susceptible to N-linked glycosylation; the V1R has sites at both the amino-terminus and at the extracellular loop, whereas the V2R has a single site at the extracellular amino-terminus.

The well known antidiuretic effect of vasopressin occurs via activation of V2R. Vasopressin regulates water excretion from the kidney by increasing the osmotic water permeability of the renal collecting duct – an effect that is explained by coupling of the V2R with the Gs signaling pathway, which activates cAMP. The V2R continues to activate Gs after being internalized by β-arrestin rather than being desensitized. This internalized Gs signaling by V2R is explained by the receptors ability to form "mega-complexes" consisting of a single V2R, β-arrestin, and heterotrimeric Gs. The increased intracellular cAMP in the kidney in turn triggers fusion of aquaporin-2-bearing vesicles with the apical plasma membrane of the collecting duct principal cells, increasing water reabsorption.

V3 receptor 

The human V3 receptor (V3R, previously known as V1BR) is a G-protein-coupled pituitary receptor that, because of its scarcity, was only recently characterized. The 424-amino-acid sequence of the V3R has homologies of 45%, 39%, and 45% with the V1R, V2R and oxytocin receptor (OTR), respectively. However, V3R has a pharmacologic profile that distinguishes it from the human V1R and activates several signaling pathways via different G-proteins, depending on the level of receptor expression.

Function
Although all three of these proteins are G-protein coupled receptors (GPCRs), activation of AVPR1A and AVPR1B stimulate phospholipase C, while activation of AVPR2 stimulates adenylate cyclase. These three receptors for vasopressin have unique tissue distributions. AVPR1A are expressed in vascular smooth muscle cells, hepatocytes, platelets, brain cells, and uterus cells. AVPR1B are expressed in cells of the anterior pituitary and throughout the brain, especially in the pyramidal neurons of the hippocampal CA2 field. AVPR2 are expressed in the kidney tubule, predominantly in the distal convoluted tubule and collecting ducts, in fetal lung tissue and lung cancer, the last two being associated with alternative splicing. AVPR2 is also expressed in the liver where stimulation releases a variety of clotting factors into the bloodstream. In the kidney, AVPR2's primary function is to respond to arginine vasopressin by stimulating mechanisms that concentrate the urine and maintain water homeostasis in the organism. When the function of AVPR2 is lost, the disease Nephrogenic Diabetes Insipidus (NDI) results.

Antagonists 
Vasopressin receptor antagonists (VRAs) are drugs that block vasopressin receptors. Most commonly VRAs are used to treat hyponatremia caused by syndrome of inappropriate antidiuretic hormone secretion (SIADH), congestive heart failure (CHF) and cirrhosis.

Somatostatin is a competitive inhibitor. 

Normally, when osmolality falls below its set point, plasma vasopressin levels become undetectable, and an aquaresis results. In SIADH, vasopressin release is not fully suppressed, despite hypotonicity. In cirrhosis and CHF, impaired delivery of solute to the diluting sites or diminished glomerular filtration rate causes impairment of maximal water-excretory capacity, resulting in persistence of vasopressin release leading to water retention.

Vasopressin receptor antagonists include the new class of "vaptan drugs" such as conivaptan, tolvaptan, mozavaptan, lixivaptan, satavaptan etc.

References

External links
 
 

G protein-coupled receptors